Rubén Alfonso de la Barrera Fernández (born 18 January 1985) is a Spanish football manager.

Managerial career
Born in A Coruña, Galicia, de la Barrera started his managerial career with Ural CF's youth categories in 2004, having previously represented the club, Victoria CF and Orillamar SD as a player. After being in charge of Atlético Arteixo and Montañeros CF's Juvenil squads, he was named manager of Tercera División side GCE Villaralbo on 27 May 2010.

De la Barrera took Villaralbo to two consecutive play-offs during his spell at the club, but still left in June 2012. After one full season without a club, he was appointed CD Guijuelo manager on 18 July 2013.

In his debut campaign in Segunda División B, de la Barrera again reached the play-offs, being knocked out by CD Leganés. On 30 June 2014, he was appointed at the helm of fellow third-tier club Real Valladolid B.

On 1 July 2015 de la Barrera returned to Guijuelo, but only finished the season in the sixth position. On 27 May of the following year he was appointed manager of Cultural y Deportiva Leonesa, achieving promotion to Segunda División as champions in his first campaign.

De la Barrera's first professional match occurred on 18 August 2017, a 0–2 away loss against Lorca FC. On 8 June of the following year, after suffering relegation in the last round, he was named Asier Garitano's assistant at Real Sociedad.

In December 2018, de la Barrera began his first job abroad, taking over on an 18-month contract at Al Ahli SC (Doha) who were 5th in the Qatar Stars League. Shortly before completing a year in the position, he left the 7th-placed club by mutual agreement.

On 7 August 2020, de la Barrera took over Romanian Liga I side FC Viitorul Constanța, but left on 30 November by agreement with his employer. The following 12 January, he replaced Fernando Vázquez at the helm of Deportivo de La Coruña, in his country's third division.

On 2 June 2021, de la Barrera was named manager of Albacete Balompié, freshly relegated to Primera División RFEF. He led the side back to the second level at first attempt, before leaving on a mutual agreement on 15 June 2022.

Managerial statistics

Honours
Cultural Leonesa
Segunda División B: 2016–17

References

External links

1985 births
Living people
Footballers from A Coruña
Spanish football managers
Segunda División managers
Primera Federación managers
Segunda División B managers
Tercera División managers
CD Guijuelo managers
Cultural Leonesa managers
Deportivo de La Coruña managers
Albacete Balompié managers
Real Sociedad non-playing staff
Qatar Stars League managers
Al Ahli SC (Doha) managers
Liga I managers
FC Viitorul Constanța managers
Spanish expatriate football managers
Spanish expatriate sportspeople in Qatar
Spanish expatriate sportspeople in Romania
Expatriate football managers in Qatar
Expatriate football managers in Romania
Association footballers not categorized by position
Association football players not categorized by nationality